Amimu Nahimana (born 1 June 1997) is a Burundian football player who plays for Varzim on loan from Chibuto.

Club career
He made his professional debut in the Segunda Liga for Varzim on 11 March 2017 in a game against Freamunde.

References

1996 births
Living people
Burundian footballers
Burundian expatriate footballers
Expatriate footballers in Mozambique
Varzim S.C. players
Expatriate footballers in Portugal
Liga Portugal 2 players
Association football forwards